Manishajith is an Indian actress who works in Tamil-language films.

Career 
Manishajith made her debut with Gambeeram (2004) in which she played Sarath Kumar's daughter. She played a child artist in nearly forty films. She made her debut as a heroine with Nanbargal Kavanathirku starring Sanjeev. In 2015, she starred in Vindhai opposite former child actor Mahendran and the horror film Kamara Kattu. She starred in several low-budget films including Thirappu Vizha, which was based on the TASMAC protests, and Enakku Innum Kalyanam Aagala starring Jagan. In 2020, she portrayed the lead role in the television serial Uyire; however, she was replaced by Shree Gopika after she fell unconscious on the sets. In July 2022, her film Kichi Kichi was released, co-starring with television anchor Azhar.

Filmography 
All films are in Tamil, unless otherwise noted.

Television

References

External links 

Living people
Actresses from Tamil Nadu
Indian film actresses
Actresses in Tamil cinema
21st-century Indian actresses
Year of birth missing (living people)
Actresses in Tamil television